Seeds is an album by American jazz saxophonist/flautist Sahib Shihab recorded in 1968 which was released on the German Vogue Schallplatten label.

Reception

The Allmusic site gave the album 4 stars.

Track listing
All compositions by Sahib Shihab except where noted.
 "Seeds" - 4:05
 "Peter's Waltz" - 5:07
 "Set Up" (Jimmy Woode) - 3:00
 "Who'll Buy My Dream" (Woode) - 3:57
 "Jay Jay" (Kenny Clarke) - 2:55
 "Another Samba" - 3:06
 "My Kind'a World" (Woode) - 3:48
 "Uma Fita de Tres Cores" (Francy Boland) - 3:04
 "Mauve" (Boland) - 3:05
 "The Wild Man" (Clarke) - 3:40

Personnel 
Sahib Shihab - baritone saxophone, flute
Francy Boland - piano 
Jimmy Woode (tracks 1-8), Jean Warland (tracks 9 & 10) - bass
Kenny Clarke - drums 
Fats Sadi - vibraphone marimba, bongos

References 

1969 albums
Sahib Shihab albums